Holme East Waver is a civil parish in the Allerdale borough of Cumbria, United Kingdom. It is bordered to the north by the civil parish of Bowness-on-Solway, to the east by the civil parishes of Kirkbride, Woodside, and Waverton, and to the south by the civil parishes of Dundraw and Holme Abbey, lands common to Holme St. Cuthbert, Holme Low, and Holme Abbey, and the town of Silloth-on-Solway. At the 2001 census, it had a population of 306 in 121 households, increasing slightly at the 2011 Census to a population of 318 in 130 households. It is named for the River Waver, and the rivers Waver and Wampool enter the Solway Firth at the western end of the parish. Part of the Solway Coast Area of Outstanding Natural Beauty is within the parish of Holme East Waver. The largest village is Newton Arlosh.

Much of the northern and western parts of the parish are marshland, dominated by the channels of the Waver and Wampool, and frequently swamped by the Solway Firth at high tide. As such, the inhabited areas of the parish are all to the east. The village of Anthorn, known for Anthorn Radio Station, is situated just to the north of Holme East Waver, across the river Wampool.

The B5307 road runs through the parish, between Abbeytown to the south and Carlisle to the east. Carlisle, Cumbria's county town, is located approximately eleven-and-a-half miles east of the parish's eastern boundary. Other nearby towns and villages include Wigton, seven miles to the south-east, Aspatria, twelve-and-three-quarter miles to the south-west, and Allonby, thirteen miles to the south-west. Kirkbride Airfield, constructed during the Second World War and used for private aviation as of the 2010s, is less than a mile away from the eastern boundary of Holme East Waver.

Governance
The civil parish falls in the electoral ward of Waver. This ward stretches south to Waverton with a total population taken at the 2011 Census of 1,803.

Hamlets and villages
Angerton
Moss Side
Newton Arlosh
Raby
Salt Coates

See also

Listed buildings in Holme East Waver

References

External links
 Cumbria County History Trust: Holme East Waver (nb: provisional research only – see Talk page)

Civil parishes in Cumbria
Allerdale